Woman in a Fur Coat (Swedish: Kvinna i leopard) is a 1958 Swedish thriller film directed by Jan Molander and starring Harriet Andersson, Ulf Palme and Erik Strandmark. It was shot at the Sundbyberg Studios in Stockholm.The film's sets were designed by the art directors Bertil Duroj and Arne Åkermark.

Synopsis
A woman unhappily married to a wealthy man has an affair with his doctor. Wishing to rid herself of her husband, she plots to kill him with poison stolen from the doctor's surgery.

Cast
 Harriet Andersson as Marianne
 Ulf Palme as Arvid Croneman
 Erik Strandmark as 	Lennart Hägg
 Sture Ström as 	Hans Lundin, Actor
 Renée Björling as 	Mathilde Croneman
 Georg Funkquist as Jörgen Bengtsson
 Siv Ericks as 	Birgitta
 Curt Masreliez as Curt
 Mona Malm as 	Anita
 Tekla Sjöblom as 	Mrs. Olsson
 Wiktor Andersson as 	Mr. Olsson
 Birgitta Andersson as 	Anna Högman
 Gösta Cederlund as Theater Agent
 Gunnar Olsson as 	Forensic Chemist
 Sven Holmberg as 	Police
 Carl-Axel Elfving as Waiter 
 Curt Löwgren as 	Porter 
 Sangrid Nerf as 	Young Woman at the Party 
 Hanny Schedin as 	Cleaning Woman 
 Carl-Gunnar Wingård as	Party Guest

References

Bibliography 
 Qvist, Per Olov & von Bagh, Peter. Guide to the Cinema of Sweden and Finland. Greenwood Publishing Group, 2000.

External links 
 

1958 films
Swedish thriller films
1950s thriller films
1950s Swedish-language films
1950s Swedish films